PRIF may refer to:
Peace Research Institute Frankfurt
Prescribed Retirement Income Funds, a type of Locked-In Retirement Account
prolactin release-inhibiting factor